American president Lyndon B. Johnson (LBJ) has been a subject of various works of media and popular culture.

Television
 In the "I Dream of Jeannie" Episode; Season 3, Episode 13: My Son, The Genie.  POTUS visits Maj. Nelson's home.  The President is shown twice, from behind only, wearing a western hat, implying it is LBJ, who was president at the time.
 In the sketch comedy show The Whitest Kids U'Know Johnson is portrayed by Sam Brown, and is shown encouraging the assassination of John F. Kennedy.
 In an episode of The Venture Bros., Johnson and his wife "Lady Hawk" appear as super villains.
 Johnson appeared as an animated caricature of himself in an episode of The Flintstones entitled, "Shinrock A Go-Go", that originally aired on December 3, 1965.
 In the Netflix series House of Cards, Lyndon B. Johnson was used as a source of themes and issues addressed in the series in relation to the series protagonist Frank Underwood played by Kevin Spacey. A photo of Johnson with Richard Russell, Jr. and references to their political relationship can be seen in the first episode of season 2.
 Clancy Brown portrays Johnson in season 3 of the Netflix series The Crown.
 Lyndon B. Johnson is portrayed as a preserved talking head in a jar in an episode of the series Futurama.

Books
 In the Odd Thomas series of novels by Dean Koontz, Johnson appears as one of the famous ghosts that haunt the titular character's home town of Pico Mundo, still wearing the hospital gown he had on when he died. When Johnson realizes Odd can see him, he responds by mooning him.
 In the short story collection Girl With Curious Hair by David Foster Wallace, the piece entitled "Lyndon" describes a large extent of Johnson's political career through his interactions with the narrator, an administrative assistant who rises to become a senior staff member and close friend of Johnson's.
 In Kevin Given's novel "Last Rites: The Return of Sebastian Vasilis" Lyndon Johnson is turned into a vampire.  The novel was adapted into a series of comic books "Karl Vincent; Vampire Hunter" and "Files of Karl Vincent" Files of Karl Vincent #1 tells how Lyndon became a vampire.
 In the 1987 novel "Evening with a Johnson" by William S. Birkin, Lyndon Johnson is portrayed as an elderly sommelier who assists the main character in synthesizing a chemical weapon. Johnson's presidential career is mirrored through the sommelier's actions and advice.

Theater
 Johnson's rise to the presidency inspired the satirical play MacBird! by Barbara Garson.
 Johnson's relationship with Martin Luther King Jr. and his support of the Voting Rights Act are depicted in Christopher Hampton's play Appomattox, which debuted at the Guthrie Theater in Minneapolis in September 2012.
 Johnson's time in office between the assassination of JFK and his reelection in 1964 is portrayed in the Robert Schenkkan play All The Way.  It was premiered at the Oregon Shakespeare Festival.  It was later followed by a production at the American Repertory Theater starring Bryan Cranston as Johnson. The play won a Tony Award for Best Play in 2014.

Movies
 In 1968 Ward Kimball directed a two-minute animated short called Escalation, which criticized Lyndon B. Johnson's Vietnam War policy by portraying him as a giant head whose phallic nose rise to erection until it explodes. The short is unique for being the only animated cartoon made independently from the Disney Studios by one of Disney's Nine Old Men. The short is further noticeable for its satirical edge and political and erotic content.
 LBJ (1968): subject of Cuban propaganda film
 The Private Files of J. Edgar Hoover (1977): played by Andrew Duggan
 King (1978, TV): played by Warren Kemmerling
 Hair (1979): The song "Initials/LBJ" mentions Johnson in the lyrics repeatedly
 Kennedy (1983, TV): played by Nesbitt Blaisdell
 The Right Stuff (1983): played by Donald Moffat
 Robert Kennedy & His Times (1985, TV): played by G. D. Spradlin
 Hoover vs. The Kennedys (1987, TV): played by Richard Anderson
 J. Edgar Hoover (1987, TV): played by Rip Torn
 LBJ: The Early Years (1987, TV): played by Randy Quaid
 LBJ (1988, TV PBS): played by Laurence Luckinbill
 JFK (1991): played by Tom Howard and John William Galt (voice)
 A Woman Named Jackie (1991): played by Brian Smiar
 Forrest Gump (1994): archive footage, voice-over by John William Galt
 Thirteen Days (2000): played by Walter Adrian
 Path to War (2002): played by Michael Gambon
 RFK (2002): played by James Cromwell
 The Kennedys (2011): played by Don Allison
 The Butler (2013): played by Liev Schrieber
 Parkland (2013): played by Sean McGraw 
 Selma (2014): played by Tom Wilkinson
 All the Way (2016, TV movie): played by Bryan Cranston
  Last Rites: The Return of Sebastian Vasilis (2016) played by David Raizor
 Jackie (2016) : played by John Carroll Lynch
 Hillary's America: The Secret History of the Democratic Party (2016): played by Sean McGraw 
 LBJ (2017): played by Woody Harrelson

Music

Over 60 songs have been released about or referencing LBJ. 
Many spoken word, comedy, and speeches about LBJ were released on vinyl records.

Video Games

 Metal Gear Solid 3: Snake Eater (2004): played by Richard McGonagle.

References